is a train station in Urausu, Kabato District, Hokkaidō, Japan.

Lines
Hokkaido Railway Company
Sasshō Line

Station layout
The station has a side platform serving one track. The unmanned station building is located beside the platform.

Adjacent stations

History
The station opened on 1 September 1960.

In December 2018, it was announced that the station would be closed on May 7, 2020, along with the rest of the non-electrified section of the Sasshō Line, but the closed date was moved up to April 17 due to COVID-19 outbreak.

References

Stations of Hokkaido Railway Company
Railway stations in Hokkaido Prefecture
Railway stations in Japan opened in 1960
Railway stations closed in 2020